Scotogramma submarina is a species of cutworm or dart moth in the family Noctuidae first described by Augustus Radcliffe Grote in 1883. It is found in North America.

The MONA or Hodges number for Scotogramma submarina is 10238.

References

Further reading

 
 
 

Hadenini
Articles created by Qbugbot
Moths described in 1883